Nikolai Aleksandrovich Arefyev (19 December 1979 – 27 April 2017) was a Russian football player.

External links
 

1979 births
2017 deaths
Russian footballers
FC Torpedo Moscow players
FC Torpedo-2 players
Russian Premier League players
FC Lokomotiv Nizhny Novgorod players
FC KAMAZ Naberezhnye Chelny players
Association football midfielders